Rehs Galleries is an art gallery at 20 West 55th Street in Midtown Manhattan, New York City. 

Rehs Galleries was elected a member of the Fine Art Dealers Association in 1995 .

Gallery exhibitions
Antonio Jacobsen: 1870s, 1880s, 1890s, January 21 – February 11, 1988
Flowers, Still life, Garden and Summer Views, October 4–24, 1988
Barry Oretsky, November – December 1989
Antonio Jacobsen: The Last 25 Years (1897–1921), January 18 – February 9, 1990
Warner Friedman – Recent Works, June 6–21, 1991
The Salon & Beyond: An Exhibition of French Paintings, 1880–1940, March 25 – April 25, 1992

References

External links
Rehs Galleries, Inc.

Art museums and galleries in Manhattan
Midtown Manhattan